Jimmy is a 2013 dramatic family film directed by Mark Freiburger. It is based on a novel of the same name, by author Robert Whitlow. The film adaptation was additionally written by director Mark Freiburger, and producer Gary Wheeler.

Plot

The central character of the film is a challenged fourteen-year-old autistic boy named Jimmy Mitchell (portrayed by Ian Colletti). In the quaint town of Pinery Grove, Georgia, he lives under the loving care of his family, striving to overcome the day-to-day struggles that surface.

While deprived of mental normality, he is naturally gifted with a unique capacity to see beyond what most see. A supernatural element coincides with his natural gift, as angelic beings he calls "Watchers", are seen throughout his everyday experiences.

His profound sense of observation leads him into trouble when stumbling onto the wrong place at the wrong time (which proves an arbitrary habit for Jimmy), as he must testify in a pivotal trial what he bore witness to.

Cast

 Ian Colletti as Jimmy Mitchell
 Ted Levine as James Lee Mitchell
 Kelly Carlson as Ellen Mitchell
 Patrick Fabian as Lee Mitchell
 Bob Gunton as Sheriff Brinson
 Burgess Jenkins as Jake Garner
 Jackson Pace as Max Cochran
 Gregory Alan Williams as Coach Sellers
 R. Keith Harris as Brother Fitzgerald
 Stelio Savante as Mr. Laney

Production

Producer Gary Wheeler had adapted two of author Robert Whitlow's novels to film prior to Jimmy, being, The List (2007) and The Trial (2010). Having directed both films, he chose to take a backseat from directorial focus to strictly co-write and produce his current film adaptation of one of Whitlow's novels, Jimmy, published in 2005.

In (roughly) 2007-2008, long-time collaborator of Wheeler's, Mark Freiburger, who had also collaborated with Wheeler on the past film adaptations of Whitlow's successful novels, was given the Jimmy novel to read by Wheeler, with the suggestion of his directing the film adaptation.

After Whitlow's approval, Freiburger was signed on to direct the film, enthusiastic about working with an actor on developing the portrayal of a mentally disabled character and, "making it believable for an audience".

Release and reception

The film premiered worldwide on the Up TV network (formerly GMC) on June 2, and was released to DVD on June 4 in the US.  In October 2013, it had a limited theatrical release in 20 cities, 4 months after the DVD release.

The film has also played at numerous events and film festivals.

References

External links
 
 

2013 television films
2013 films
Films set in Georgia (U.S. state)
Films based on American novels
Autism in the arts
Films about autism
Films shot in North Carolina